A crossing, in ecclesiastical architecture, is the junction of the four arms of a cruciform (cross-shaped) church.

In a typically oriented church (especially of Romanesque and Gothic styles), the crossing gives access to the nave on the west, the transept arms on the north and south, and the choir, as the first part of the chancel, on the east.

The crossing is sometimes surmounted by a tower or dome. A large crossing tower is particularly common on English Gothic cathedrals. With the Renaissance, building a dome above the crossing became popular.  Because the crossing is open on four sides, the weight of the tower or dome rests heavily on the corners; a stable construction thus required great skill on the part of the builders. In centuries past, it was not uncommon for overambitious crossing towers to collapse. Sacrist Alan of Walsingham's octagon, built between 1322 and 1328 after the collapse of Ely's nave crossing on 22 February 1322, is  the "... greatest individual achievement of architectural genius at Ely Cathedral" according to architectural historian Nikolaus Pevsner.

A tower over the crossing may be called a lantern tower if it has openings through which light from outside can shine down to the crossing.

In Early Medieval churches, the crossing square was often used as a module, or a unit of measurement. The nave and transept would have lengths that were a certain multiple of the length of the crossing square.

The term is also occasionally used for secular buildings of a cruciform plan, for instance The Crystal Palace in London.

Gallery

References 

Church architecture